Miguel Augusto Prince Franco (born 30 July 1957) is a Colombian football manager and former player.

Playing career

Club
Born in Ocaña, Norte de Santander, Prince played football as a defender for Millonarios during his 17-year professional career.

International
Prince scored six goals in 19 appearances for the senior Colombia national football team, including participating at the 1983 Copa América.

Managerial career
After he retired from playing, Prince began coaching football. In November 2008, Prince was appointed manager of Atlético Huila. He has also led Millonarios, Unión Magdalena, Deportivo Pasto, Patriotas and Atlético Bucaramanga.

References

External links
 
 
 Miguel Augusto Prince at Soccerway

1957 births
Living people
Colombian footballers
Colombia international footballers
1983 Copa América players
Categoría Primera A players
Atlético Bucaramanga footballers
Millonarios F.C. players
América de Cali footballers
Colombian football managers
Millonarios F.C. managers
Association football defenders
People from Norte de Santander Department
Deportes Tolima managers
Unión Comercio managers
Deportivo Pasto managers
Patriotas Boyacá managers
Cúcuta Deportivo managers